Tough All Over may refer to:

Tough All Over (John Cafferty & The Beaver Brown Band album), 1985
"Tough All Over" (song), a 1985 song by John Cafferty and the Beaver Brown Band
Tough All Over (Shelby Lynne album), 1990
"Things Are Tough All Over" (song), this album's title track
Tough All Over (Gary Allan album), 2005, or its title track